Tohfatu'l-Ahbab is a Farsi work by Muhammad Ali Kashmiri, presumably written in 1642. It is the biography of Shamsu'd-Din Muhammad Araki, a Shi'a Muslim missionary who visited Kashmir, Gilgit and Baltistan in the 15th and 16th century. Araki was the founder of the Nurbakhshiyyeh Sufi order in Kashmir. The work was translated into English by Kashi Nath Pandit.

See also
Baharistan-i-shahi

References

Further reading

External links

 Tohfat-ul-Ahbab on Rekhta. Full version in Urdu.

History of Kashmir
History of Pakistan
History books about India
1642 books
17th-century Indian books
Kashmiri literature
Pakistani literature